E16, E-16, E.16 or E 16 may refer to:

Computing 
 The version 0.16 of the Enlightenment window manager

Military 
 Aichi E16A, an Imperial Japanese Navy seaplane which saw service during World War II
 HMS E16, a United Kingdom Royal Navy submarine which saw service during World War I

Transportation 
 European route E16
 County Route E16 (California), a county route in El Dorado County, California, United States
 The FAA location identifier for San Martin Airport in San Martin, California
 The DRG Class E 16, a German electric locomotive
 Yokohama–Yokosuka Road, an expressway numbered E16 in Japan

Other 
 E16, a postcode district in the E postcode area of London
 E16 is sometimes used to abbreviate Echovirus 16, the cause of Boston exanthem disease
 Alien of Extraordinary Ability (EB-1A, officially E11 / E16), a special green card for high achieving immigrants in United States.